Erke Duit (born 30 December 1957 in Bremen) is a German conductor, composer and director of several choirs and ensembles.

Life 
After his Abitur, Duit studied church music at the University of Music and Performing Arts Vienna, specialising in choral conducting (with Hans Gillesberger, Erwin Ortner), composition (with Erich Romanovsky), media composition (with Paul Kont), conducting (with Karl Österreicher) and at Biola College, Los Angeles (scholarship; organ with Charles Shaffer).

He is the father of a son and a daughter. Since 2005, he has been teaching Musical Interpretation and Role Designat the Music and Arts University of the City of Vienna.

Works 
 1992 Cantata Hödlmoser, text:  For the steirischer herbst
 1994 Setting of texts by H. C. Artmann for the NÖ. Donaufestival
 1995 The Library of Babel, together with Fritz Rainer and Wolfgang Huber
 1997 Celentano Arrangements, for La Cappella Vienna, performed at the 
 1998 The Bremen Town Musicians, chamber orchestra work
 1999 Orchestral work KINDER, for Karl Friedrich Flic
 2000 Cantata adam.eva.aus with the 
 2001 Waldviertler Suite for 34 wind instruments (performed with the GRENZBLÄSERN)
 2002 Hohes Haus Musik, setting to music of the black-blue government declaration, premiere in the Austrian Parliament with the Chorvereinigung Gegenstimmen choir
 2003 Brandner Kaspar, a theatre music for vocal quartet (performed by the SCHLEICHQUARTETT)
 2005 Gib mir die Kugel'', a full-length globalisation cantata with the Gegenstimmen Choir

Activities 
320 rock concerts as singer/pianist with the group "Robin" (tour West US), since 1981 freelance composer and musician. Musical director or composer/pianist: 1981-1988 Volkstheater, Vienna, Theater in der Josefstadt, Theater d.

Orchestra 
 1995-2002 director of the Capella Nova Klosterneuburg (chamber orchestra)
 Director of the Camerata Wien since 1990
 Musical director of the Volkskunstorchester
 Musical director of the Waldviertler Hoforchester (border wind orchestra)

Numerous recordings on CD, MC, LP for ORF (Radio + TV)

Choirs 
 Lecturer for advanced pop ensemble at the VEREINTEN STIMMEN for the summer semester 2005.
 Since 1994 Duit has directed the Viennese political choir Chorvereinigung Gegenstimmen.

References

External links 
 
 Website of the "Gegenstimmen"
 Konservatorium Wien, Vorstellung Erke Duit
 Website of the "Schleichquartett"
 

20th-century classical composers
20th-century German composers
German choral conductors
1957 births
Living people
Musicians from Bremen